The AIM-7 Sparrow (Air Intercept Missile) is an American, medium-range semi-active radar homing air-to-air missile operated by the United States Air Force, United States Navy, and United States Marine Corps, as well as other various air forces and navies. Sparrow and its derivatives were the West's principal beyond visual range (BVR) air-to-air missile from the late 1950s until the 1990s. It remains in service, although it is being phased out in aviation applications in favor of the more advanced AIM-120 AMRAAM.

The early Sparrow was intended primarily for use against larger targets, especially bombers and had numerous operational limitations in other uses. Against smaller targets, the need to receive a strong reflected radar signal made achieving lock-on at the missile's effective range difficult. As the launching aircraft's own radar needed to be pointed at the target throughout the engagement, this meant that in fighter-vs-fighter combat, the enemy fighter would often approach within the range of shorter-range infrared homing missiles while the launching aircraft had to continue flying towards its target. Additionally, early models were only effective against targets at roughly the same or higher altitudes, below which reflections from the ground became a problem.

A number of upgraded Sparrow designs were developed to address these issues. In the early 1970s, the RAF developed a version with an inverse monopulse seeker and improved motor known as Skyflash, while the Italian Air Force introduced the similar Aspide. Both had the ability to be fired at targets below the launching fighter ("look-down, shoot down"), were more resistant to countermeasures, and were much more accurate in the terminal phase. This basic concept was then made part of the US Sparrows in the M model (for monopulse) and some of these were later updated as the P model, the last to be produced in the US. Aspides sold to China resulted in the locally produced PL-11. The Japan Self-Defense Forces also employ the Sparrow missile, though it is being phased out and replaced by the Mitsubishi AAM-4.

The Sparrow was also used as the basis for a surface-to-air missile, the RIM-7 Sea Sparrow, used by a number of navies for air defense. Fired at low altitude and flying directly at its target, although, the range of the missile in this role is greatly reduced due to the increased air density of the lower atmosphere. With the retirement of the Sparrow in the air-to-air role, a new version of the Sea Sparrow was produced to address this concern, producing the larger and more capable RIM-162 ESSM.

Development

Sparrow I

The Sparrow emerged from a late-1940s United States Navy program to develop a guided rocket weapon for air-to-air use. In 1947 the Navy contracted Sperry to build a beam riding version of a standard  HVAR, the standard unguided aerial rocket, under  Project Hotshot. The weapon was initially dubbed KAS-1, then AAM-2, and, from 1948 on, AAM-N-2. The airframe was developed by Douglas Aircraft Company. The diameter of the HVAR proved to be inadequate for the electronics, leading Douglas to expand the missile's airframe to  diameter. The prototype weapon began unpowered flight-tests in 1947, and made its first aerial interception in 1952.

After a protracted development cycle the initial AAM-N-2 Sparrow entered limited operational service in 1954 with specially modified Douglas F3D Skyknight all-weather carrier night fighters. In 1956, they were joined by the McDonnell F3H-2M Demon and Vought F7U Cutlass fighter aircraft. Compared to the modern versions, the Sparrow I was more streamlined and featured a bullet-shaped airframe with a long pointed nose.

Sparrow I was a limited and rather primitive weapon. The limitations of beam-riding guidance (which was slaved to an optical sight on single-seater fighters and radar with night fighters) restricted the missile to attacks against targets flying a straight course and made it essentially useless against a maneuvering target. Only about 2,000 rounds were produced to this standard.

Sparrow II

As early as 1950 Douglas examined equipping the Sparrow with an active radar seeker, initially known as XAAM-N-2a Sparrow II, the original retroactively becoming Sparrow I. In 1952 it was given the new code AAM-N-3. The active radar made the Sparrow II a "fire and forget" weapon, allowing several to be fired at separate targets at the same time.

By 1955 Douglas proposed going ahead with development, intending it to be the primary weapon for the F5D Skylancer interceptor. It was later selected, with some controversy, to be the primary weapon for the Canadian Avro Arrow supersonic interceptor, along with the new Astra fire-control system. For Canadian use and as a second source for US missiles, Canadair was selected to build the missiles in Quebec.

The small size of the missile forebody and the K-band AN/APQ-64-radar limited performance, and it was never able to work in testing. After considerable development and test firings in the U.S. and Canada, Douglas abandoned development in 1956. Canadair continued development until the Arrow was cancelled in 1959.

Sparrow X
A subvariant of the Sparrow I armed with the same nuclear warhead as the MB-1 Genie was proposed in 1958 but was cancelled shortly thereafter.

Sparrow III

Concurrently with the development of the Sparrow I, in 1951, Raytheon began work on the semi-active radar homing version of Sparrow family of missiles, the AAM-N-6 Sparrow III. The first of these weapons entered United States Navy service in 1958.

The AAM-N-6a was similar to the -6, but used a new Thiokol liquid-fuel rocket engine for improved performance. It also included changes to the guidance electronics to make it effective at higher closing speeds. The -6a was also selected to arm the Air Force's F-110A Spectre (F-4 Phantom) fighters in 1962, known to them as the AIM-101. It entered production in 1959, with 7500 being built.

Another upgrade reverted to a Rocketdyne solid-fuel motor for the AAM-N-6b, which started production in 1963.

During this year the Air Force and Navy agreed on standardized naming conventions for their missiles. The Sparrows became the AIM-7 series. The original Sparrow I and aborted Sparrow II became the AIM-7A and AIM-7B, despite both being out of service. The -6, -6a, and -6b became the AIM-7C, AIM-7D, and AIM-7E respectively.

25,000 AIM-7Es were produced and saw extensive use during the Vietnam War, where its performance was considered disappointing. The mixed results were a combination of reliability problems (exacerbated by the tropical climate), limited pilot training in fighter-to-fighter combat, and restrictive rules of engagement that generally prohibited BVR (beyond visual range) engagements. The Pk (kill probability) of the AIM-7E was less than 10%; US fighter pilots shot down 59 aircraft out of the 612 Sparrows fired. Of the 612 AIM-7D/E/E-2 missiles fired, 97 (or 15.8%) hit their targets, resulting in 56 (or 9.2%) kills. Two kills were obtained beyond visual range.

In 1969 an improved version, the E-2, was introduced with clipped wings and various changes to the fuzing. Considered a "dogfight Sparrow", the AIM-7E-2 was intended to be used at shorter ranges where the missile was still travelling at high speeds, and in the head-on aspect, making it much more useful in the visual limitations imposed on the engagements. Even so, its kill rate was only 13% in combat, leading to a practice of ripple-firing all four at once in hopes of increasing kill probability. Its worst tendency was that of detonating prematurely, approximately a thousand feet in front of the launching aircraft, but it also had many motor failures, erratic flights, and fuzing problems. An E-3 version included additional changes to the fuzing, and an E-4 featured a modified seeker for use with the F-14 Tomcat.

Vietnam War (1965–1973) records

Improved versions of the AIM-7 were developed in the 1970s in an attempt to address the weapon's limitations. The AIM-7F, which entered service in 1976, had a dual-stage rocket motor for longer range, solid-state electronics for greatly improved reliability, and a larger warhead. Even this version had room for improvement, leading British Aerospace and the Italian firm Alenia to develop advanced versions of Sparrow with better performance and improved electronics as the BAe Skyflash and Alenia Aspide, respectively.

The most common version of the Sparrow today, the AIM-7M, entered service in 1982 and featured a new inverse monopulse seeker (matching the capabilities of Skyflash), active radar proximity fuse, digital controls, improved ECM resistance, and better low-altitude performance. It was used to good advantage in the 1991 Gulf War, where it scored many USAF air-to-air kills. Of 44 missiles fired, 30 (68.2%) hit their intended targets resulting in 24/26 (54.5%/59.1%) kills. 19 kills were obtained beyond visual range.

The AIM-7P is similar in most ways to the M versions, and was primarily an upgrade program for existing M-series missiles. The main changes were to the software, improving low-level performance. A follow-on Block II upgrade added a new rear receiver allowing the missile to receive mid-course correction from the launching aircraft. Plans initially called for all M versions to be upgraded, but currently P's are being issued as required to replace M's lost or removed from the inventory.

The final version of the missile was to have been the AIM-7R, which added an infrared homing seeker to an otherwise unchanged AIM-7P Block II. A general wind-down of the budget led to it being cancelled in 1997.

Sparrow is now being phased out with the availability of the active-radar AIM-120 AMRAAM, but is likely to remain in service for several years.

Foreign versions

Canada

As part of the Avro Canada CF-105 Arrow program, Canadair (now Bombardier) partnered with Douglas Aircraft Company in the development of the Sparrow II (AAM-N-3/AIM-7B).  After Douglas dropped out of this program, Canadair continued on with it until the termination of the Arrow project.

The AAM-N-3 Sparrow II was unique in that it had a fully active radar guidance system. This combined both a radar transmitter and receiver in the missile, making it unnecessary for the pilot to keep the aircraft aimed at the target after firing the missile, unlike Semi-active radar homing (SARH) missiles which require continuous radar-assisted guidance throughout flight. This allowed the aircraft that fired the AAM-N-3 to turn away, prosecute other targets, and/or escape from potential retaliatory missiles fired by the enemy aircraft during the time it takes for the Sparrow to reach its target. Despite the significant advantages of this design over SARH guidance, all subsequent models of the Sparrow use semi-active radar homing.

To accommodate the active radar guidance system, the AAM-N-3 Sparrow II had a much greater volume than its predecessor. Its size would subsequently set the precedent for all future Sparrow variants.

In 1959, Canadair had completed five missiles based on airframes from Douglas, and built two models from scratch, when the program was cancelled with the cancellation of the Arrow.

Italy

The Italian company Finmeccanica (now Leonardo S.p.A.), Alenia Difesa licensed the AIM-7E Sparrow technology from the US, and produced its own version.
Later in the 1980s, Alenia started to produce an improved version of the AIM-7 called the Aspide, compared to the AIM-7E, it received a newer and improved monopulse guiding system that allowed for a better hit ratio and easier targeting of enemies at low altitude confused in the ground clutter.
It also received a new and more powerful engine and new control surfaces, these control surfaces were all independent one of the others, this gave the missile a much better maneuverability compared to the AIM-7E and the English Skyflash that still used dependent control surfaces.

People's Republic of China

The PL-11 and HQ-6 is a family of Chinese missiles developed by the Shanghai Academy of Science and Technology, largely based on the Italian Aspide missile – a version of the Sparrow.

Soviet Union
The Soviet Union acquired an AIM-7 in 1968 and a Vympel team started copying it as the K-25. The missile did not enter production as the R-23 was thought to have better versatility, range, signal processing logic, and immunity from interference. K-25 work ended in 1971, but analysis of the Sparrow was later used to inform the design of the Vympel R-27, particularly the servomechanisms and movable wings.

UK

British Aerospace (BAe) licensed the AIM-7E2 technology in the 1970s, producing the Skyflash missile. Skyflash used a Marconi XJ521 monopulse seeker together with improvements to the electronics. It was powered by the Aerojet Mk52 mod 2 rocket engine (later by the Rocketdyne Mk38 mod 4). Skyflash entered service with the Royal Air Force (RAF) on their Phantom FG.1/FGR.2 in 1978, and later on the Tornado F3. Skyflash was also exported to Sweden for use on their Viggen fighters.

An upgraded version with active radar seeker, called Active Sky Flash was proposed by BAe and Thomson-CSF, but did not receive funding because the RAF opted for other missiles.

Design
The Sparrow has four major sections: guidance section, warhead, control, and rocket motor (currently the Hercules MK-58 solid-propellant rocket motor). It has a cylindrical body with four wings at mid-body and four tail fins. Although the external dimensions of the Sparrow remained relatively unchanged from model to model, the internal components of newer missiles represent major improvements, with vastly increased capabilities. The warhead is of the continuous-rod type.

As with other semi-active radar guided missiles, the missile does not generate radar signals, but instead homes in on reflected continuous-wave signals from the launch platform's radar. The receiver also senses the guidance radar to enable comparisons that enhance the missile's resistance to passive jamming.

Principle of guidance 

The launching aircraft will illuminate the target with its radar. In radars of the 1950s these were single target tracking devices using a nutating horn as part of the antenna. This caused the beam to be swept in a small cone. Signal processing would be applied to determine the direction of maximum illumination and so develop a signal to steer the antenna toward the target. The missile detects the reflected signal from the target with a high gain antenna in a similar fashion and steers the entire missile toward closure with the target. The missile guidance also samples a portion of the illuminating signal via rearward pointing waveguides. The comparison of these two signals enabled logic circuits to determine the true target reflection signal, even if the target were to eject radar-reflecting chaff.

Operators

See also

 AIM-9 Sidewinder
 AIM-54 Phoenix
 R-27
 Brazo
 List of missiles
 Sparoair
 Super 530

Notes

References

Footnotes

Bibliography
 
 McCarthy Jr., Donald J. MiG Killers, A Chronology of U.S. Air Victories in Vietnam 1965-1973. 2009; Specialty Press, USA.  .

External links

 Aero Arrow Recovery Canada
 GlobalSecurity.org
 Designation-Systems.Net

AIM-7
Military equipment introduced in the 1950s
Raytheon Company products